In Hinduism, Anumati ("divine favor" in Sanskrit, Devanagari: अनुमति) is a lunar deity and goddess of spirituality. Her vehicle is Krisha Mrigam or Krishna Jinka (Blackbuck).

Anumati is a word in Hindi meaning "permission" or "to grant permission". Anumati is the beholder of a formal activity of mother nature i.e. permission/s. As a basic discipline encapsulated in every creature in this nature of "permission of activities and events", Anumati makes it peaceful, childlike, and calm as the featured Moon; to the creatures of this universe which includes human beings on this planet.

Anumati is seen as a personification or form of Shakti.

Dhātā, the seventh son of Aditi, had four wives, named Kuhū, Sinīvālī, Rākā, and Anumati.

References

External links 
 https://prabhupadabooks.com/sb/4/1/34?d=1

Hindu goddesses
Lunar goddesses

tr:Anumati